Robert Poujade (6 May 1928 – 8 April 2020), born in Moulins, Allier, was a French politician. He was the first French Minister of the Environment and was mayor of Dijon from 1971 to 2001.

Biography 
The son of a professor of literature, Poujade became a teacher in literature after having studied at the Ecole normale supérieur.

Initially politically active for environmental causes, and a member in the successive Gaullist parties (RPF, UNR, UDR, RPR), Poujade became the first Minister of the Environment in France in 1971. He served in the government of Prime Minister Jacques Chaban-Delmas, under the presidency of Georges Pompidou. 

As an opponent to the mayor of Dijon Félix Kir, Robert Poujade ran for Member of Parliament for the first time in 1962. He succeeded only in 1967, and stayed at the parliament to 1981, year of Mitterrand's victory. He was returned at the National Assembly in year 1986 and held the post continuously until his retirement in 2002. 

In Dijon, Robert Poujade entered the city council in 1968. After Felix Kir's death in 1971, he became the first Gaullist mayor of Dijon. He retired in 2001, and his successor Jean-François Bazin lost the election against François Rebsamen, who became the first Socialist mayor of the City since before the Second World War.

References

1928 births
2020 deaths
Politicians from Moulins, Allier
Rally of the French People politicians
National Centre of Social Republicans politicians
Union for the New Republic politicians
Union of Democrats for the Republic politicians
Rally for the Republic politicians
French Ministers of the Environment
Deputies of the 3rd National Assembly of the French Fifth Republic
Deputies of the 4th National Assembly of the French Fifth Republic
Deputies of the 5th National Assembly of the French Fifth Republic
Deputies of the 6th National Assembly of the French Fifth Republic
Deputies of the 8th National Assembly of the French Fifth Republic
Deputies of the 9th National Assembly of the French Fifth Republic
Deputies of the 10th National Assembly of the French Fifth Republic
Deputies of the 11th National Assembly of the French Fifth Republic
Mayors of Dijon
École Normale Supérieure alumni
Knights of the Ordre national du Mérite
Commandeurs of the Légion d'honneur
Commandeurs of the Ordre des Arts et des Lettres